Ida von Kortzfleisch (1850-1915), was a German educator. She is known as the founder of the Reifensteiner Schulen, a chain of household schools for women which became very popular and influential from 1896 onward.

References 
 Johannes Kramer: Das ländlich-hauswirtschaftliche Bildungswesen in Deutschland, Dissertation an der Universität Erlangen, Fulda 1913

19th-century German people
19th-century German educators
1850 births
1915 deaths